Hanan Tork (born 7 March  1975 is a retired Egyptian actress and ballerina. She was born as Hanan Hasan Abdelkrim Tork, and is credited as Hanan Tork. She is a sister to two brothers: hussien and Hossam. Her father owned his own factory for clothes (El Torky for female dresses).

In addition to her work in the arts, Hanan also serves as a worldwide ambassador for the international charity . She started her career as a ballerina and completed her studies at the Cairo Ballet Institute in 1993. She then became a member of the Cairo Ballet Group and soon after moved to the Classical Ballet Group.

Biography

She began her acting career when the famous director, Khairy Beshara saw her, and offered her the chance to act alongside Nadia Al-Gindi in the 1991 movie "Raghbah Motawaheshah". After that the young ballerina was thirsty for more and got her next role in television series “El Awda El Akheera” having the chance to act alongside Salah Zulfikar in one of his final acting roles. Her next role was in "Be’r Sabe’ " with the director Nur Eldemerdash. Among other TV roles were parts in El Sabr F El Mallahat, El Mal W El Banun and Lan A'ish Fi Gelbab Abi. In 1993, she was offered another role on the silver screen: "Dehk We Le’b We Gadd W Hobb". Her big chance came when she was chosen by the famous director Youssef Chahine to play a part in El Mohager in 1994.

In 1997, she acted alongside the singer Mohamed Fouad in Ismailia Rayeh Gai. In the same year, she also had the opportunity to work with Chahin once again by starring in his movie Al Masir. Then in 1999, she had leading roles in Al Akhar and Fata Men Israel. Then yet another cooperation between the young star and the famous director in the box office hit Al Assefa. In the year 2000, the now famous actress appeared in the Ramadan serial Opera Aida. She then saw more success in the following year, with a role alongside the famous actress Samira Ahmed in "Amira Men Abdeen". She also played the leading female role in the comedy movie Ga'na Al Bayan Al Taly, opposite Mohamed Henedi. In 2001 Hanan played a role in the comedy movie Gawaz Be Karar Gomhourey. Then came her large hits Haramiyya Fi KG2 in 2002 and Haramiyyah fi Tayland in 2003. In 2 In 2007, she was nominated for Best Performance by an Actress at the Asia Pacific Screen Awards of Kas w lask film.

In 2005 the film "Dunia" by Lebanese director Jocelyne Saab was released, in which Hanan played the leading role. The movie centers around the title character Dunia, a belly dancer and poet. When the film aired at the 2005 Cairo International Film Festival, it left the audience split between those who supported the film’s call for intellectual freedom and its stance against female circumcision, and those who disapproved of the title character’s desire to physically express herself through dance. It was also controversial that so many scenes were filmed in Cairo’s slums, which could be seen to tarnish Egypt's international image. The film was especially controversial in Egypt for taking up the tradition of female circumcision, among other reasons; it received a good deal of attention in Europe.

In 2006, Hanan she chose to begin wearing the religious headscarf, and has been very vocal about this decision. By doing so, Hanan Tork has joined a group of actresses who also made the decision, such as Hala Shiha and Abla Kamel. Despite wearing a religious headscarf , she has continued acting. In August 2012, she decided to stop acting and focus on her family, albeit with different roles.
She was married previously to businessman Khaled Khatab, they divorced in 2007.  Hanan Tork has stated that one of the main factors that led to her divorce was her husband's displeasure at her choosing to wear religious headscarf and was not happy with her "change in behavior", after she became religious.
In 2012, she got remarried to Mahmud Malek, the brother of Muslim Brotherhood activist leader Hasan Malek. It was reported that despite her retirement, due to her past background of being an entertainer, Malek's family were against their marriage . Hanan Tork has three children from her first marriage and two from her second.
Her husband owns a men's fashion boutique in Cairo.

Retirement 

Hanan Tork quit acting during the Ramadan season 2012.  Since then, she only participates in Egyptian Cartoon movies and series via her voice.

Filmography

Film

Television

References

External links

 
 Hanan Turk Official Page https://web.archive.org/web/20110929134849/http://www.hananelturky.com/
http://www.elcinema.com/person/pr1023973/

1975 births
Living people
Egyptian Muslims
Egyptian actresses
Egyptian ballerinas
20th-century Egyptian actresses
21st-century Egyptian actresses